Michael Richard Lewis (born 17 August 1977) is a Welsh musician. He is best known as the former rhythm guitarist for the Welsh alternative rock band Lostprophets, Welsh/American alternative rock band No Devotion and hardcore punk band Public Disturbance.

Early life
Lewis studied civil engineering for a year before turning to music. His mother was a shop assistant, and his father worked in management for a chemical company. Lewis attended Hawthorn High School in Pontypridd. His favourite subjects were Science and History. His first concert, as a concertgoer, came when he saw Tesla at St David's Hall.

Career
Before Lostprophets formed, Lewis was in a band called Public Disturbance. He was initially the original bassist for Lostprophets, but soon became the rhythm guitarist, with Stuart Richardson replacing him on the bass guitar. After the split of Lostprophets in 2013, Lewis became the manager to a few smaller bands.

On 1 May 2014 it was announced that the former members of Lostprophets (including Lewis) have formed a new band and are writing new music. On 1 July 2014, the new band No Devotion released their first single, "Stay" and have since released their debut album, Permanence.

No Devotion's second album is due to be released sometime in the future, although the only members of the band confirmed to be on the album were Geoff Rickly, Lee Gaze and Stuart Richardson. Gaze confirmed that keyboardist Jamie Oliver had departed from the band while also stating that Mike had not left the band but he hadn't worked with the other band members on the album.

Personal life
In September 2006, Lewis married his girlfriend, Amber (née Payne). They have a daughter, Gwyneth, and now reside in Malibu, a few streets away from bandmate Jamie Oliver. Amber runs Shoppe Amber Interiors.

Lewis is an avid Star Trek fan and owns a Star Trek uniform. He is a lifelong Everton fan. He surfs Santa Monica beach almost every day when he is at home. Lewis has stated on his Facebook page he is vegan.

Discography
Lostprophets

Public Disturbance
 4-Way Tie Up (1997)
 UKHC Compilation (1997)
 Victim of Circumstance (1998)
 Possessed to Hate (1999)
 Ushering in a New Age of Quarrel – a UKHC Tribute to the Cro-Mags (1999)

No Devotion
 Permanence

Equipment
Guitars:
 Dan Armstrong plexiglass
 PRS Black Singlecut
 PRS White Singlecut
 PRS Black Custom 24
 Fender Telecaster Deluxe 73
 Gibson Les Paul Standard Black
 Gibson SG Standard Black
 Rickenbacker 330 Jetglow Black
Amplification:
 Fender Hotrod Deville 2×12 (semi distortion & clean)
 Blackstar Artisan 30 Combo (semi distortion & clean)
 Orange Thunderverb 200W Head (Main distortion)
 Orange 4×12 Cabinet
Effects:
 Line 6 Delay Modeler DL4
 Line 6 Modulation Modeler MM4
 Boss Phaser
 Electro Harmonix Holier Grail
 Rocktron Hush Noise Gate
 visual noise chorus
 blackstar HT-Dual
 Sennheiser Wireless System
 Korg Rack Tuner
 Furman Power Conditioner

References

External links
Mike Lewis interview

1977 births
Living people
People from Pontypridd
Welsh rock guitarists
Welsh rock bass guitarists
Place of birth missing (living people)
Lostprophets members
People educated at Hawthorn High School
Rhythm guitarists
21st-century bass guitarists
No Devotion members